Hesham Abdelaal (born 5 September 1993, in Dakahlia Governorate) is an Egyptian boxer. At the 2012 Summer Olympics, he competed in the Men's flyweight, but was defeated in the first round.

References

1993 births
Living people
Olympic boxers of Egypt
Boxers at the 2012 Summer Olympics
Flyweight boxers
Boxers at the 2010 Summer Youth Olympics
Egyptian male boxers
People from Dakahlia Governorate
Mediterranean Games silver medalists for Egypt
Mediterranean Games medalists in boxing
Competitors at the 2013 Mediterranean Games
21st-century Egyptian people